Leilani (born Leilani Sen, November or December 1978, Hatfield, Hertfordshire, England) is an English (part Chinese) pop singer. She was signed to ZTT records from 1998-2000 and is best known for her 1999 UK hit single, "Madness Thing" (UK No. 19). She scored two more chart hits with "Do You Want Me" (UK No. 40) and "Flying Elvis" (UK No. 73).
A fourth single was planned; "This Is Your Life" and an album "Precious Treasure" but remains Unreleased. 

2023

As a mark of her 25th anniversary of the release of her debut single "Madness Thing" a fanclub page has been set up with a hint of a possible return for Leilani.
https://instagram.com/leilani_ztt_fanclub?igshid=YmMyMTA2M2Y=

Discography
1999: "Madness Thing" - UK No. 19
1999: "Do You Want Me" - UK No. 40
2000: "Flying Elvis" - UK No. 73
2000: "This Is Your Life" (Unreleased)
2000: "Precious Treasure" (Album) (Unreleased)

References

1978 births
Living people
Musicians from Hertfordshire
Leilani
21st-century English women singers
21st-century English singers